Robert Zedwane (born 1 May 1942) is a Canadian sports shooter. He competed in the men's 50 metre rifle, prone event at the 1984 Summer Olympics.

References

External links
 

1942 births
Living people
Canadian male sport shooters
Olympic shooters of Canada
Shooters at the 1984 Summer Olympics
20th-century Canadian people